Hernán Casanova (born 6 February 1994) is an Argentine tennis player.

Casanova had a career high ATP singles ranking of World No. 255 achieved on 21 May 2018. He also has a career high ATP doubles ranking of World No. 183 achieved on 27 June 2022.

Casanova made his ATP doubles main draw debut at the 2022 Argentina Open after entering into the main draw as alternates with Sergio Galdós.

He made his ATP singles main draw debut at the 2022 Generali Open Kitzbühel as a qualifier where he lost to Jurij Rodionov.

References

External links
 
 

1994 births
Living people
Argentine male tennis players
Tennis players from Buenos Aires
21st-century Argentine people